Mark O'Connor is American composer and fiddler.

Mark O'Connor may refer to:

 Mark O'Connor (footballer) (born 1963), British professional footballer
 Mark O'Connor (Gaelic footballer),  for Cork
 Mark O'Connor (sportsman) (born 1997), Australian rules and Gaelic footballer
 Mark O'Connor (poet) (born 1945), Australian poet and writer